We Believed is a 2010 Italian drama film directed by Mario Martone, based on a screenplay by Martone and Giancarlo De Cataldo inspired by events around the 19th-century Young Italy political movement and based on the novel of the late art historian Anna Banti. Nominated for the Golden Lion at the 67th Venice International Film Festival, the film was released in Italy on 12 November 2010.

Plot
The film is divided into four chapters, titled "Le scelte" ("Choices"), "Domenico," "Angelo," and "L'alba della Nazione" ("Dawn of the Nation"). The story follows three boys growing up in the Cilento Valley in southern Italy in the early 19th century in what was then the Kingdom of the Two Sicilies. Salvatore, who is all about patriotic spirit, Domenico, who believes in friendship, and Angelo, a restless and violent man.

In 1828 all three join Young Italy, a political movement seeking unification if Italy founded by Giuseppe Mazzini. Following this decision, their lives take different paths, tracing some episodes of the historical Risorgimento period which sought to consolidate various territories on the Italian Peninsula into a single unified state.

Cast

 Luigi Lo Cascio as Domenico
 Valerio Binasco as Angelo
 Francesca Inaudi as Young Cristina of Belgiojoso
 Guido Caprino as Felice Orsini
 Renato Carpentieri as Carlo Poerio
 Ivan Franěk as Simon Bernard
 Andrea Bosca as Young Angelo
 Edoardo Natoli as Young Domenico
 Luigi Pisani as Salvatore
 Stefano Cassetti as Rudio
 Michele Riondino as Saverio
 Franco Ravera as Gomez
 Andrea Renzi as Sigismondo Castromediano
 Edoardo Winspeare as Nisco
 Anna Bonaiuto as Cristina of Belgiojoso
 Toni Servillo as Giuseppe Mazzini
 Luca Zingaretti as Francesco Crispi
 Romuald Andrzej Klos as Stanislaw Worcell
 Luca Barbareschi as Antonio Gallenga
 Roberto Accornero as Luigi Melegari

References

External links

2010 films
2010 drama films
Italian drama films
2010s Italian-language films
Films directed by Mario Martone